Scoparia encapna is a moth of the family Crambidae. It was described by Edward Meyrick in 1888. It is endemic to New Zealand.

The wingspan is 18–20 mm. The forewings are dark glossy fuscous with bronzy reflections and a few scattered white scales. The veins are partially marked with black. The first line is whitish and black-margined posteriorly. The second line is also whitish, but dark-margined anteriorly. The hindwings are fuscous-grey, with a suffused dark fuscous hindmarginal band. Adults have been recorded on wing in January.

References

Moths described in 1888
Moths of New Zealand
Scorparia
Endemic fauna of New Zealand
Taxa named by Edward Meyrick
Endemic moths of New Zealand